Ovesen is a surname. Notable people with the surname include:

Gene Ovesen (1928–2019), American curler
Jesper Ovesen (born 1957), Danish businessman
Nina Krebs Ovesen (born 1996), Danish cyclist
Willy Ovesen (1924–2015), Norwegian civil servant

Surnames of Scandinavian origin